The 1967 Michigan State Spartans men's soccer team represented Michigan State University during the 1967 NCAA soccer season. The Spartans played at Spartan Stadium in East Lansing, Michigan and were coached by 12th-year head coach, Gene Kenney. The Spartans competed as an independent.

The 1967 season was one of the most successful season in program history, as they were declared NCAA co-champions along with the Saint Louis Billikens, making it one of two seasons the Spartans won the NCAA title in men's soccer. The team was considered to be part of the 1960s golden age of Michigan State sports, where their wrestling and football teams also won national titles during that time.

Roster 
The following players are known to be part of the team's 1967 roster.

Schedule 

|-
!colspan=6 style=""| Regular season
|-

|-
!colspan=6 style=""| NCAA Tournament
|-

|-

References

External links 
Record Book

Michigan State Spartans men's soccer seasons
1967 NCAA soccer independents season
Michigan State Spartans soccer
NCAA Division I Men's Soccer Tournament-winning seasons
NCAA Division I Men's Soccer Tournament College Cup seasons